Rajan Mehra (23 November 1933 – 4 October 2010) was an Indian cricket umpire. He stood in two Test matches between 1986 and 1987 and three ODI games between 1982 and 1987. Mehta played 14 first-class matches for Delhi in the 1950s.

See also
 List of Test cricket umpires
 List of One Day International cricket umpires

References

1933 births
2010 deaths
Place of birth missing
Indian Test cricket umpires
Indian One Day International cricket umpires
Indian cricketers
Delhi cricketers